Richmond Hill Law School is a historic home and law school building located near Richmond Hill, Yadkin County, North Carolina.  It was built in 1848, and is a two-story, three bay, "T"-plan, brick building.  It has a low hipped roof and deep overhang. It was built as the home and law school of jurist Richmond Mumford Pearson.

Among those who studied at the school were Secretary of the Interior Jacob Thompson, State Chief Justices William A. Hoke and David Furches, U.S. District Judge Thomas Settle, Congressman William H. H. Cowles, Governors John W. Ellis, Daniel Gould Fowle and Robert B. Glenn, and two-term Mayor of Charlotte, NC, William Johnston.  The property is owned by the Yadkin County Historical Society.

It was listed on the National Register of Historic Places in 1970.

References

External links
NCpedia

School buildings on the National Register of Historic Places in North Carolina
Law schools in North Carolina
School buildings completed in 1848
Buildings and structures in Yadkin County, North Carolina
National Register of Historic Places in Yadkin County, North Carolina
Defunct law schools